Deadsy is an American industrial rock band from Los Angeles. The band is known for its visual appearance and unique musical style the band self-describes as "undercore". The band has released two major studio albums.

The band was initially signed to Sire Records, but the band's self-titled debut album for the label was shelved shortly before its 1997 release. After attempting to re-work the album, they were ultimately dropped from the label in 1999. After eventually signing to Jonathan Davis' Elementree Records, and finally releasing the album, now known as Commencement, in 2002, Deadsy toured across the United States, most notably performing on the Family Values Tour. After the release of Phantasmagore on Immortal Records/Elementree in 2006, the band took a hiatus in 2007. In 2020, it was reported the band had plans for a 2021 release of its third album titled "Subterfugue", ahead of its re-release of Phantasmagore. As of November 2022, the album has not yet been released.

History

Early years and formation (1995–1996)
Deadsy formed in the summer of 1995, when Elijah Blue Allman (son of Cher and Gregg Allman) started recording a handful of demos (including "Flowing Glower", "Dear" and a cover of Pavement's "Texas Never Whispers") with Alec Puro on drums and producer Josh Abraham. He later sent a Juno 106 keyboard to his longtime friend from prep school Renn Hawkey (Dr. Nner) as an invitation to join the band. The three members evolved their sound in the studio and sought out a record deal out of, among other things, "adolescent necessity".

Sire Records (1996–1999)
While Deadsy shopped for its first record deal, Seymour Stein, President of Sire/Elektra Records, signed the band. Because they had no bass player at the time, Jay Gordon (of Orgy) was asked to play bass for their short self-titled album. After the album was recorded and released for promotion, the band temporarily relocated to New York City. Deadsy performed an impromptu showcase at Coney Island in 1997. Deadsy's self-titled album was slated for a release in the Spring of 1997, but due to Sire Records separating from Elektra Records, Seymour Stein halted plans for the release, and the band continued recording with Abraham. They also contributed the song "Replicas" to the Gary Numan tribute album Random on Beggars Banquet Records. London Records absorbed Sire Records and folded the label, leaving Deadsy at Warner Bros. They gave the band the option to leave with full ownership of their master recordings.

In 1998, Craig Riker joined as the bassist full-time and the band would continue writing and recording songs (including "Commencement", "She Likes Big Words" and "Seagulls") for the album which would now be titled 'Commencement.

Commencement (1999–2003)
In April 2000, Deadsy signed to Elementree Records, a label owned by longtime supporter Jonathan Davis of Korn, and by June 2000 the band secured the album's widespread distribution through DreamWorks Records.  Ashburn Miller replaced Riker on bass in January 2002. With help from friend and Limp Bizkit frontman Fred Durst, they filmed a music video for "The Key To Gramercy Park". After multiple delays, Commencement was released on May 14, 2002, and the album debuted at number 100 of the Billboard 200 chart. A second video was filmed for their second single, a cover of Sebadoh's "Brand New Love". They were invited to perform on the 2001 Family Values Tour, and the band toured throughout 2002 with bands including Korn and Mindless Self Indulgence.  The band recorded additional songs for the album with Jay Baumgardner and Josh Abraham (including a cover of Rush's "Tom Sawyer", "Winners" and the lead single "The Key to Gramercy Park").

Phantasmagore (2003–2007)
After DreamWorks Records was merged into Interscope in late 2003, Deadsy moved on from Dreamworks Records and signed with Immortal Records in 2006. Phantasmagore was released on August 22, 2006, and featured the 5 band members on the album cover in black and white. The album debuted on the Billboard 200 chart and Deadsy was asked back to appear on the Family Values Tour in 2006. Deadsy co-headlined a nationwide tour with the Deftones and also appeared at Lollapalooza that year. In January 2007, Deadsy parted ways with bassist Ashburn Miller, and added Jens Funke to their tour line up.

Hiatus (2007–2017)
In February 2007, a short statement from Allman confirmed that the band was taking a hiatus. Carlton Bost then joined The Dreaming full-time. On April 16, 2007, a MySpace bulletin was posted with a statement by Alec Puro, who wrote, "As you all know we are going to be taking a short break from Deadsy so Elijah can make a solo record and I can continue scoring projects I wasn't able to do from the road". In early 2008, Elijah Blue and the Trapezoids was revealed as the name of Allman's solo project, though as of 2016, the project has yet to release anything more than three demos on its MySpace page. He also was reported as following a career in visual art.

In February 2010, Allman claimed, "Deadsy is sleeping at the moment". Ashburn Miller and Carlton Bost joined Orgy's new line-up in September 2012.

Reformation (2018–present)
On November 16, 2018, Deadsy (Allman, Hawkey, Puro and Bost) played a semi-acoustic show alongside Queens of the Stone Age at San Quentin State Prison. This marked the band's first appearance since 2006.

On July 14, 2020, Deadsy (now stylized as DÆDSY) announced on social media that their forthcoming album titled "Subterfugue", is to be released in early 2021. They also announced that Phantasmagore would be remastered and returning to digital platforms and receiving a vinyl release. Craig Riker rejoined the band on bass, and Phantasmagore was re-released on Deadsy's own Tran Kilo label on November 2.

Musical style and lyrical themes
Allman describes the band's low and dissonant style as "undercore". His baritone singing style and guitars, Hawkey's synthesizers, Puro's drums and Bost's Z-Tar all contribute to the sound. Allman stated, "We wanted to make something that was transcendental, really rule-defying, and very against the grain and when people listened to it at first, it would just feel very like a sense of foreignness, almost like watching a David Lynch film.

The lyrics and imagery of the songs sometimes focused on many subjects in either sexual, religious, magical or popular culture contexts. Occasionally, there are references to esoterica, secret societies, The Urantia Book, The Holy Mountain (1973 film), the novel Dune by Frank Herbert, and even Walt Disney's 101 Dalmatians.

Members and visual appearances
Allman has often called the band an "art project" complete with a manifesto and visual iconography. The band was once described as "monied prep school secret society crossed with teenage fascist group." Each band member represents one element or "entity" that drives human society. Each entity is also represented by their own color and unique appearance. Many of the multi-color ideas were influenced directly from the 1955 film This Island Earth. Blue represented International Klein Blue and academia, Puro represented green and leisure, Hawkey represented yellow and science and medicine, Bost represented grey and war, and Riker represented red and horror. The band members also carry a white plastic chain accessory.

Blue and Hawkey, former students at Maine's Hyde School, stated being "fascinated by Skull and Bones and other secret societies and all that stuff that people are very curious about that create an air of mystique". Blue continued by saying: "I often call this band 'a perversion of privilege'."

Current members
 Elijah Blue Allman – lead vocals, rhythm guitar, programming (1995–2007, 2017–present)
 Alec Puro – drums, programming (1995–2007, 2017–present)
 Renn Hawkey – keyboards, synthesizer (1995–2007, 2017–present)
 Carlton Bost – lead guitar, Z-Tar (1999–2007, 2017–present)
 Craig Riker – bass (1998–2002, 2020–present)

Former members
 Andy Trench – bass (1997)
 Jay Gordon – bass (1997–1999)
 Ashburn Miller – bass (2002–2007)
 Jens Funke – bass (2007)

Timeline

Discography
Studio albums

Singles

Extras
 "Asura" (demo clip) (1:24)
 "Asura" (demo) (3:27)
 "Avalon" (demo) (4:49) cover song originally by Roxy Music. Track originally appeared on an early cassette demo but was not in broad circulation.
 "Babes In Abyss" (demo) (3:23)
 "Better Than You Know" (demo clip) (1:58)
 "Better Than You Know" (unmastered) (6:14)
 "Book of Black Dreams" (demo clip) (1:03)
 "Brand New Love" (radio mix) (3:42)
 "Carrying Over" (live) (4:24) from Family Values Tour compilation 2006
 "Colossus" (demo) (4:25) featuring Aimee Echo made available to participants of a MySpace promotional effort
 "Crimson & Clover" (3:37) song originally from the 1999 film A Walk on the Moon featuring Allman's mother, Cher
 "Dear" (demo) (6:47)
 "Do You Want It All?" (unreleased) (0:00) Unreleased Phantasmagore song, it is known to have been played once at the Roxy in 2004
 "Dreamcrusher" (demo clip) (1:13)
 "Fox on the Run" (Sweet cover) (3:24), originally to be released on Commencement (it's on the 1999 promo of the album), later released on the Whatever It Takes soundtrack
 "Friends" (3:58) available for purchase through iTunes
 "Girl" (live) (2:32) cover song originally by T.Rex, it is known to have been played at Vintage Vinyl Records in 2006
 "Just Like Heaven" (demo) (6:02) cover song originally by The Cure
 "The Thing That Should Not Be" (unreleased) (0:00) cover song originally by Metallica, it is known to have been played once at the Whisky A Go Go in 2001
 "The Key to Gramercy Park" (demo) (3:11)
 "The Key to Gramercy Park" (Instrumental) (3:36)
 "Mansion World" (deepsky remix) (7:41)
 "My Only Friend" (3:26) cover song originally from The Magnetic Fields for Winter Passing'' soundtrack
 "Replicas" (5:12) was featured on a Gary Numan tribute album in 1997
 "Sands of Time" (demo clip) (1:17) demo clip for a track eventually known as "Time"
 "Sleeping Angel" (unreleased) (0:00) Stevie Nicks cover song that appeared on the first demo tape, the song has yet to publicly surface
 "Strength of Mind" (demo) (3:27) was made available by Immortal Records by mistake. Several purchases were made before it was quickly taken down
 "Texas Never Whispers" (3:43) cover song by the band Pavement
 "Tom Sawyer" (live) (4:11) from Family Values Tour compilation 2001

Music videos

Notes

 A  For its original 2001 release in the United States, "The Key to Gramercy Park" was released as a double A-side single with "Mansion World". "The Key to Gramercy Park" was re-released in 2002.

References

American dark wave musical groups
American industrial metal musical groups
American electronic rock musical groups
Musical groups established in 1995
Musical groups disestablished in 2007
Nu metal musical groups from California
Orgy (band) members